Radyo 3 is a radio network of Turkish Radio and Television Corporation (TRT). This network specializes in all types of western music such as classical music, jazz and popular music.

There are also short news bulletins in Turkish, English, French and German. In the past, this network was also used together with TV for foreign film broadcasts. While the TV broadcast in Turkish, Radyo 3 broadcast the original soundtrack.

Technical details 

Radyo 3 broadcasts on FM band. Below is the frequencies of some of the transmitters of Radyo 3. (The ERP power of the FM transmitters are 50 or 100 kW)

References

External links 

  

Turkish radio networks
Classical music radio stations
Turkish Radio and Television Corporation